Cherry Gardens may refer to:

 Cherry Gardens, Bristol, England
 Cherry Gardens, South Australia, Australia
 Cherry Gardens, Virginia, United States